The Arcana Cœlestia, quae in Scriptura Sacra seu Verbo Domini sunt, detecta, usually abbreviated as Arcana Cœlestia (Heavenly Mysteries or Secrets of Heaven) or under its Latin variant, Arcana Cælestia, is the first and largest work published by Emanuel Swedenborg in his theological period. It was written and published in Neo-Latin, in eight volumes, one volume per year, from 1749 to 1756.

It consists of an exegesis of the spiritual sense of the books of Genesis and Exodus, according to the doctrine of correspondence (theology), and demonstrated by many supporting quotations from the Hebrew Bible and the New Testament. While not denying the historicity of the stories of the Patriarchs (Bible) and The Exodus from Egypt, it explains them as describing symbolically the process of spiritual growth and struggles in each individual person.

What follows is the opening paragraph of Arcana Coelestia Volume 1, and therefore the opening statement of the whole corpus of theological work that Swedenborg claimed was revealed to him.

Editions
There have been several translations made of Arcana Cœlestia (together with the rest of Swedenborg's theological work). Three are currently available:

Swedenborg Foundation Standard Edition (12 volumes) 

Volumes of the  Standard Edition were originally issued from 1929 to 1956, with the majority in 1938.

(a) A redesigned (not retranslated) hardback is available from the Swedenborg Foundation for purchase.

(b) The Swedenborg Foundation also provides a volume-by-volume downloadable version at no cost.

(c) A searchable, online edition is available on the New Christian Bible Study website.

(d) Sacred Texts provides a DVD version for purchase and an online version at no cost.

Swedenborg Society (12 volumes) 

This is a new contemporary translation, available in hardback and paperback for purchase.

Swedenborg Foundation New Century Edition (3 of 15 volumes currently available)
This also is a new contemporary edition, the translation of which is still in progress. The three volumes that have been released so far can be purchased in e-book, paperback, and hardcover formats, or downloaded for free as PDF or EPUB files.

The Neo-Latin original

Swedenborg's theological works were written in Neo-Latin.

(a) The Neo-Latin first edition published by Swedenborg  is available online at no charge.

(b) Here is another source for that text:

(c) Photographic images of the actual pages of the Neo-Latin first edition, again published by Swedenborg, are available online at no charge.

The first translation into English

First Translation of Swedenborg's theological writings - 16th Chapter of Genesis as explained in the Arcana Cœlestia - This translation from Neo-Latin into English was commissioned by Swedenborg himself and is a photocopy of a first edition copy. A preface by Swedenborg is included. (PDF - 12MB).

Summaries and comments

1. See Editor's Preface and the Reviser's Preface in the opening pages of the Standard Edition, Volume 1. The Reviser Preface contains a summary of the publishing history for the work originally published by Swedenborg.

2. See contents summary in text in box at bottom of this page.

Notes

Bibliography 

 
 
 Sigstedt, C.,The Swedenborg Epic. The Life and Works of Emanuel Swedenborg (New York: Bookman Associates, 1952, Chapter 27)

Works by Emanuel Swedenborg
Old Testament theology
Biblical exegesis
Biblical studies
Swedenborgianism
Books about the Bible
Book of Genesis
Book of Exodus
18th-century Latin books